The Fort Worth Air Route Traffic Control Center (ZFW) is located at 13800 FAA Road, Fort Worth, Texas, United States 76155. The Fort Worth ARTCC is one of 22 Air Route Traffic Control Centers in the United States.

Dallas/Fort Worth International Airport is north of the control center.
 
On December 30, 2020, a case of COVID-19 caused an evacuation of the control center and a complete ground stop.

Airports served by the Fort Worth ARTCC

Commercial airports
 Arkansas
 Texarkana Regional Airport (Texarkana) 
 Louisiana
 Monroe Regional Airport (Monroe) 
 Shreveport Regional Airport (Shreveport) 
 Oklahoma
 Lawton-Fort Sill Regional Airport (Lawton) 
 Will Rogers World Airport (Oklahoma City) 
 Texas
 Dallas/Fort Worth International Airport (Euless/Grapevine/Irving, near Dallas and Fort Worth)
 Dallas Love Field (Dallas)
 Killeen-Fort Hood Regional Airport (Bell County, near Killeen)
 East Texas Regional Airport (Gregg County, near Longview)
 Lubbock Preston Smith International Airport (Lubbock) 
 Midland International Airport (Midland) 
 San Angelo Regional Airport (San Angelo) 
 Tyler Pounds Regional Airport (Smith County, near Tyler) 
 Waco Regional Airport (Waco) 
 Wichita Falls Municipal Airport (Wichita Falls)

Airspace control

High Sector Map

Low Sector Map

References

External links
Ft. Worth Center Weather Service Unit (CWSU) (NWS/FAA)
NATCA Local ZFW Fort Worth Center

Air traffic control centers
Air traffic control in the United States
Transportation buildings and structures in Fort Worth, Texas
WAAS reference stations
Aviation in Texas
Dallas/Fort Worth International Airport